The 1853 Stockholm cholera outbreak was a severe outbreak of cholera which occurred in Stockholm, Sweden in 1853 as part of the third cholera pandemic. It killed about 3,000 people.

It was the second cholera epidemic in Stockholm, and the first one since the 1834 Stockholm cholera outbreak, which had been the first in the city. The epidemics of 1834 and 1853 were also the biggest cholera outbreaks in Stockholm, as both of them resulted in about 3.000 deaths.

History
At the time, it was not known what caused cholera. However, there were theories that the epidemics were affected by poor hygiene. In this period, the latrine and waste systems in Stockholm were handled by private entrepreneurs and were in very bad condition, and the drinking water was not filtered.  In 1859, Stockholm inaugurated its own central system for tending to the latrine and waste of the city, which radically improved the hygiene in Stockholm, a reform which was reportedly influenced by the 1853 outbreak.  In 1861, Stockholm proceeded by also inaugurating its first water works for the filtering and cleansing of the city's drink water, a reform which resulted in fewer deaths by cholera in the city.

The 1853 Stockholm cholera outbreak was not the last cholera outbreak in Stockholm. On the contrary: from 1853 onward, it returned almost every year until it finally disappeared in 1894. However, it was never again as bad as it had been in the first two outbreaks of 1834 and 1853, and the deaths and the number of infected became smaller each time until the last time in 1894.

References 

Disasters in Stockholm
1853 in Sweden
Cholera outbreaks
19th century in Stockholm
Disease outbreaks in Sweden
19th-century epidemics
1853 disasters in Sweden